Harald Stenvaag (born 5 March 1953) is a Norwegian rifle shooter who started competing internationally at the ISSF World Shooting Championships in Switzerland in 1974. He has represented Norway in the Summer Olympics 6 times, and has two Olympic medals. He has a total of 67 international medals in the Olympics, World Shooting Championships and the European Shooting Championships in his career. He was born in Ålesund.

He is running his own shooting business called Stenvaag våpensenter as in Asker outside of Oslo.

Olympic results

Records

References

External links
 Homepage of Stenvaag våpensenter (in Norwegian)

1953 births
Living people
Norwegian male sport shooters
ISSF rifle shooters
Olympic silver medalists for Norway
Olympic bronze medalists for Norway
Olympic shooters of Norway
Shooters at the 1984 Summer Olympics
Shooters at the 1988 Summer Olympics
Shooters at the 1992 Summer Olympics
Shooters at the 1996 Summer Olympics
Shooters at the 2000 Summer Olympics
Shooters at the 2004 Summer Olympics
People from Asker
Sportspeople from Ålesund
Olympic medalists in shooting

Medalists at the 2000 Summer Olympics
Medalists at the 1992 Summer Olympics
20th-century Norwegian people